Nunation, in some Semitic languages such as Literary Arabic, is the addition of one of three vowel diacritics (ḥarakāt) to a noun or adjective.

This is used to indicate the word ends in an alveolar nasal without the addition of the letter nūn. The noun phrase is fully declinable and syntactically unmarked for definiteness, identifiable in speech.

Literary Arabic 

When writing Literary Arabic in full diacritics, there are three nunation diacritics, which indicate the suffixes  (IPA: /-un/) (nominative case),  /-in/ (genitive), and  /an/ (accusative).

In most dialects of spoken Arabic, nunation only exists in words and phrases borrowed from the literary language, especially those that are declined in the accusative (that is, with ). It is still used in some Bedouin dialects in its genitive form , such as in Najdi Arabic.

Since Arabic has no indefinite article, nouns that are nunated (except for proper nouns) are indefinite, and so the absence of the definite article  triggers nunation in all nouns and substantives except diptotes (that is, derivations with only two cases in the indefinite state, -u in the nominative and -a in the accusative and genitive).

Xiao'erjing

Xiao'erjing is a Perso-Arabic script adopted for writing of Sinitic languages such as Mandarin (especially the Lanyin, Zhongyuan and Northeastern dialects) or the Dungan language. This writing system is unique (compared to other Arabic-based writing systems) in that all vowels, long and short, are explicitly marked at all times with Arabic diacritics. In this script, the three nunations are used extensively to represent the alveolar (front) nasal sounds ("-n"), and also sometimes to represent velar (back) nasal sounds ("-ng").

Akkadian language 

Nunation may also refer to the   ending of duals in Akkadian (until it was dropped in the Old Babylonian period).

Character encodings

See also
Arabic diacritics
Mimation

References

Semitic linguistics
Arabic grammar